Abu Saleh Mohammad Mustafizur Rahman (24 November 1934 – 30 November 1996) was a lieutenant colonel of the Bangladesh Army, a Jatiya Sangsad member of parliament representing the Khulna-2 and Bagerhat-2 constituencies, and a government minister.

Early life
Rahman was born on 24 November 1934 at Ranabijoypur in Bagerhat in the then Bengal Presidency. His father Khan Bahadur Bazlur Rahman was a custom commissioner. He studied in St. Xavier's Collegiate School in Kolkata, West Bengal. He studied further in St. Gregory's School in Dhaka, East Bengal and later joined Dhaka College. He graduated from Peshawar University.

Career
Rahman joined the Pakistan army as a cadet in 1952 and received his commission on 13 March 1955. He started his career in the army in the Fifth Baloch Regiment. In 1956 he was selected to be an artillery officer. He worked in the Inter-Service Detective Branch. He completed his PSC degree from the Command and Staff College in Queta, Pakistan in 1962. After the independence of Bangladesh, he joined the Bangladesh army and was promoted to lieutenant colonel in 1973. He retired from service soon after.

Rahman started his political career after retirement from the army. President Ziaur Rahman placed him in charge of the Ministry of Home in 1977. In 1978 he was made the Minister of Foreign Affairs. In 1979 he was elected to parliament from Bagerhat-2 from the Bangladesh Nationalist Party. he served as the Home Minister until 27 November 1981. He was the Commerce Minister in the Abdus Sattar Cabinet. He was elected as general secretary of the Bangladesh Nationalist Party in 1985.

In 1991, Rahman was elected to parliament and served subsequently as the foreign minister from March 1991 to March 1996. He served as the president of Gulshan Rotary Club and Cricket Control Board. He was a former chairman of National Sports Control Board and Mohammedan Sporting Club and Brothers Union Club. In 1993 he received the Gawanghwa Medal from the South Korean government.

Rahaman died on 30 November 1996.

References

1934 births
1996 deaths
Dhaka College alumni
Bangladeshi lieutenant colonels
Bangladesh Nationalist Party politicians
General Secretaries of Bangladesh Nationalist Party
Foreign ministers of Bangladesh
2nd Jatiya Sangsad members
5th Jatiya Sangsad members
6th Jatiya Sangsad members